Ilova may refer to:
Gornja Ilova, a village in Bosnia and Herzegovina (near Prnjavor)
Grabik Ilova, a village in Bosnia and Herzegovina (near Prnjavor)
Pečeneg Ilova, a village in Bosnia and Herzegovina (near Prnjavor)
Velika Ilova, a village in Bosnia and Herzegovina (near Prnjavor)
 Ilova, Croatia, a village near Kutina, Croatia
 Ilova, Caraș-Severin, a village in Caraș-Severin County, Romania

See also 
 Ilova River (disambiguation)